is a Japanese group rhythmic gymnast. She represents her nation at international competitions.

She participated at the 2012 Summer Olympics in London. 
She also competed at world championships, including at the 2010 World Rhythmic Gymnastics Championships.

References

External links

https://database.fig-gymnastics.com/public/gymnasts/biography/14830/true?backUrl=%2Fpublic%2Fresults%2Fdisplay%2F2146%3FidAgeCategory%3D8%26idCategory%3D78%23anchor_11722
http://www.gettyimages.com/photos/natsuki-fukase?excludenudity=true&sort=mostpopular&mediatype=photography&phrase=natsuki%20fukase&family=editorial

1994 births
Living people
Japanese rhythmic gymnasts
Place of birth missing (living people)
Gymnasts at the 2012 Summer Olympics
Olympic gymnasts of Japan
21st-century Japanese women